Ireland competed at the 1964 Summer Paralympics in Tokyo, Japan. It did not won any medals.

References

Nations at the 1964 Summer Paralympics
Ireland at the Paralympics
1964 in Irish sport